Ankara Yıldırım Beyazıt University is a university located in Ankara, Turkey. It was established in 2010.

Faculties

 Faculty of Medicine 
 Faculty of Law 
 Faculty of Humanities and Social Sciences 
 Faculty of Islamic Sciences 
 Business School 
 Faculty of Engineering and Natural Sciences 
 Faculty of Health Sciences 
 Faculty of Fine Arts 
 Faculty of Political Sciences 
 Faculty of Architecture 
 Faculty of Dentistry 
 Faculty of Aerospace Sciences 
 State Conservatory for Turkish Music

Affiliations
The university is a member of the Caucasus University Association.

Campuses
 Main Esenboga Campus (Çubuk/Ankara)
 Etlik Eastern Campus (Milli İrade Binası)  (Keçiören/Ankara)
 Etlik Western Campus (15 Temmuz Şehitleri Binası) (Keçiören/Ankara)
 Cinnah Campus (Çankaya/Ankara)
 Bilkent Campus (Çankaya/Ankara)
 Çubuk Campus (Çubuk/Ankara)
 Ulus -Extra administrative building- (Altındağ/Ankara)

See also 
 List of universities in Ankara 
 List of universities in Turkey

References

Universities and colleges in Turkey
2010 establishments in Turkey
State universities and colleges in Turkey
Educational institutions established in 2010
Education in Ankara
Universities and colleges in Ankara